Ernst August II Konstantin, Duke of Saxe-Weimar-Eisenach (2 June 1737 – 28 May 1758), was a duke of Saxe-Weimar-Eisenach.

Early life
He was the second (fifth in order of birth) but eldest and only surviving son of Ernst August I, Duke of Saxe-Weimar by his second marriage to Margravine Sophie Charlotte of Brandenburg-Bayreuth, eldest daughter of Georg Friedrich Karl, Margrave of Brandenburg-Bayreuth.

Life
Ernst August II Konstantin's father, a splendor-loving ruler with a passion for hunting, had moved his court to Eisenach. The duke neglected his son and heir, so that Ernst August II Konstantin spent his early years under the supervision of the Hofmarschall of Schloss Belvedere in Weimar.

Ernst August I died in 1748, when Ernst August II Konstantin was eleven years old. Since he was still a minor, the dukes Frederick III of Saxe-Gotha-Altenburg and Franz Josias of Saxe-Coburg-Saalfeld assumed the regency of Saxe-Weimar-Eisenach on Ernst August II Konstantin's behalf. The young duke came to live with Duke Frederick in Gotha, who made sure that Ernst August II Konstantin received an appropriate education.

In 1755 Ernst August II Konstantin assumed the reins of government. He appointed his former tutor, the Imperial Count (Reichsgräf) Heinrich von Bünau, as his new chancellor. Because the young duke had been a sickly child, he was encouraged to marry quickly in order to ensure an heir for the duchy.

Marriage
In Brunswick on 16 March 1756, Ernst August II Konstantin married Anna Amalia of Brunswick-Wolfenbüttel. They had two sons:
 Karl August, Duke of Saxe-Weimar-Eisenach, Grand Duke from 21 April 1815 (b. Weimar, 3 September 1757 – d. Graditz, 14 June 1828).
 Frederick Ferdinand Constantine (b. posthumously, Weimar, 8 September 1758 – d. Wiebelskirchen, 6 September 1793) who died unmarried.

When Ernst August II Konstantin died, the hereditary prince Karl August was still an infant. Ernst August Konstantin's widow, the duchess Anna Amalia, presided as regent over an excellent tutelary government which propelled Weimar into the classical period.

Ancestry

|-

|-

1737 births
1758 deaths
Nobility from Weimar
Dukes of Saxe-Weimar-Eisenach
Dukes of Saxe-Weimar
Dukes of Saxe-Eisenach
Recipients of the Order of the White Eagle (Poland)